"Play the Game" is a song by British rock band Queen, written by Freddie Mercury. It is the first track on the first side of their 1980 album The Game. It also appears on their album Greatest Hits. The single was a hit in the UK, reaching #14 in the charts, and in the US, peaking at #42.

Composition
The song commences with a series of overlapping rushing noises on an Oberheim OB-X synthesiser, heralding the band's acceptance of electronic instruments into their once explicitly "no synths" sonic repertoire. They played it in their live shows from 1980–82.

The song features a soft vocal by Mercury, ending with a strong A4 rising in pitch all the way to C5 in chest voice (contrary to the other C5s being hit in falsetto). Mercury also played piano on the track.

Billboard considered "Play the Game" to be a return to Queen's traditional "epic, rather grand sound" after deviating from that sound with the rockabilly of their prior single "Crazy Little Thing Called Love."  Cash Box similarly said that this is a return to Queen's "patented high tech, progressive pop sound" and they commented on "Freddie Mercury's breathless falsetto and sweet piano work" and "Brian May’s soaring lead guitar." Record World said that "Freddy Mercury leads a celestial choir of pretty falsettos juxtaposed with soaring guitars."

Later singles "It's a Hard Life" and "You Don't Fool Me" revisit the theme presented in "Play the Game", with Mercury writing from the same lover's perspective years later in the former song, and reflecting on the memories of the failed relationship in the latter. Both "Play the Game" and "It's a Hard Life" are of a similar structure, revolving around Mercury's piano playing and the band's multi-layered harmonies.

Music video
The cover of the single, as well as its promotional video directed by Brian Grant, marked the first time Mercury appeared in either format with what later became his trademark moustache. Brian May did not use his trademark Red Special guitar, instead using a Fender Stratocaster replica made by Satellite. This was likely due to the risk of damage involved in the shot in which Mercury snatches the guitar from May, then appears to throw it back to him which was played back in reverse so that it would be easier for May to play the solo after "catching" the guitar in the video. A shot of the band in the unedited blue screen set for the video was later used for the cover of the "Another One Bites the Dust" single release.

Personnel
Freddie Mercury – lead and backing vocals, piano, synthesiser
Brian May – electric guitar, backing vocals
Roger Taylor – drums, backing vocals
John Deacon – bass guitar

Charts

Beach House version

The Baltimore, Maryland indie rock duo Beach House recorded a cover of "Play the Game" that was contributed for the iTunes Store release of the Red Hot Organization's 2009 compilation, Dark Was the Night. The track was released as an iTunes only bonus track.
On June 30, 2017, the band released their B-Sides and Rarities compilation album, which includes the cover.

References

External links
Official YouTube videos: original music video, Live at the Bowl
Lyrics at Queen official website

Queen (band) songs
1980 singles
1980 songs
EMI Records singles
Elektra Records singles
Hollywood Records singles
Song recordings produced by Reinhold Mack
Songs written by Freddie Mercury
Rock ballads